"You Can't Miss Nothing That You Never Had" is a song written by Ike Turner and released by Ike & Tina Turner in 1964.

Release 
"You Can't Miss Nothing That You Never Had" was released as non-album track on Ike Turner's Sonja label in February 1964. At the time of the release, Billboard magazine had discontinued the R&B singles chart from November 30, 1963 to January 23, 1965. Billboard therefore uses Cash Box magazine's stat in their place. The single reached No. 29 on the R&B charts and No. 122 on Bubbling Under The Hot 100.

"You Can't Miss Nothing That You Never Had" was later included on the Kent compilations The Ike & Tina Turner Sessions (1987) and The Kent Years (2000).

Critical reception 

Cash Box (February 15, 1964): The vet r&b singers could create a sales stir with this top-flight medium-paced tear-jerker with commercial rhythmic, teen-angled beat. Eye it.

Track listing

Covers 

 The Detroit Cobras released a version titled "Can't Miss Nothing" on their 2001 album Life, Love and Leaving

Chart performance

References 

1964 songs
1964 singles
Ike & Tina Turner songs
Songs written by Ike Turner
Song recordings produced by Ike Turner